The following is a list of coaches who have coached the Sydney Swans at a game of Australian rules football in the Australian Football League (AFL), formally the VFL. They were known as South Melbourne prior to their relocation to Sydney in 1982.

Key: 
 P = Played
 W = Won
 L = Lost
 D = Drew

See also

References

External links
Allthestats.com

Lists of Australian Football League coaches by club
 
Sydney-sport-related lists